Two male athletes from Zimbabwe competed at the 1996 Summer Paralympics in Atlanta, United States.

See also
Zimbabwe at the Paralympics
Zimbabwe at the 1996 Summer Olympics

References 

Nations at the 1996 Summer Paralympics
1996
Summer Paralympics